Victoria Lake is a lake located in the west-central interior of the island of Newfoundland in the province of Newfoundland and Labrador, Canada. The lake is south-east of Red Indian Lake.

Lakes of Newfoundland and Labrador